This article is a list of mass shootings in the United Kingdom. Mass shootings are firearm-related violence with at least four casualties. 
This list does not include violence during the Troubles.

21st century

2020s

2010s

20th century

1990s

1980s

1970s

1960s

1950s

1930s

1900s

19th century

1840s

Notes

References

United Kingdom crime-related lists
United Kingdom
Mass shootings in the United Kingdom